Solovetsky District is an administrative district (raion), one of the twenty-one in Arkhangelsk Oblast, Russia. It is located on the Solovetsky Islands archipelago in the White Sea. Its administrative center is the rural locality (a settlement) of Solovetsky. District's population:

History
The Solovetsky Monastery was founded in the 15th century and quickly became one of the most influential Orthodox monasteries in Russia. The islands were administered by the monastery until the October Revolution in 1917. Formally, they belonged to Archangelgorod Governorate (1708-1780), Vologda Viceroyalty (1780-1796), and Arkhangelsk Governorate (1796-1929). In 1929, the islands were included into newly established Northern Krai as an island territory (not a part of any district).

Solovetsky District was established on March 23, 1987. On January 1, 2006, Solovetsky Municipal District was merged into Primorsky Municipal District, although its administrative status as a district remained unaffected.

Administrative and municipal status
Administratively, Solovetsky District is unique in Arkhangelsk Oblast because it cannot be transformed in any way other than merging it into Primorsky District as a selsoviet. Municipally, the district is incorporated as Solovetskoye Rural Settlement within Primorsky Municipal District.

References

Notes

Sources

Districts of Arkhangelsk Oblast
 
States and territories established in 1987